

The Helowerks HX-1 is an American ultralight homebuilt helicopter designed by Helowerks based at Hampton in Virginia.

Design and development
The Wasp is a traditional pod and boom helicopter with a twin-blade rotor powered by a 90shp (97 kW) Garrett JFS-100-13A turboshaft engine. It has a fixed skid landing gear and enclosed cabin with two-seat side-by-side seats. The Wasp design was started in 2001 and was exhibited unflown in 2005, it first flew around March 2006 after receiving FAA approval in the experimental category.

Specifications

See also

References
Notes

Bibliography

2000s United States helicopters
Homebuilt aircraft
2000s United States civil utility aircraft
Aircraft first flown in 2006